Fotbal Club Brașov, commonly known as FC Brașov, or simply as Brașov, was a Romanian professional football club based in the city of Brașov, Brașov County, founded in 1936 and dissolved in 2017.

Originally founded as Uzinele Astra Brașov, the team amassed 41 seasons in the top flight of Romania. Its kits were yellow and black, and it played its home matches at the Silviu Ploeșteanu Stadium.

Since 2021, there are two clubs which assert to be the continuation of the original entity—the fan-owned SR Brașov and the new FC Brașov, which is supported by the local authorities.

History

Early modern football in Brașov

Football in Brașov started between 1912 and 1914. In 1928, the unrelated Colțea Brașov won the national title and enjoyed a decade's long rivalry with Braşovia, the city's other major, which reached the semifinals of the Romanian National League in 1925.

Uzinele Astra Braşov made their debut in the Romanian league system in the 1939–1940 season, when it competed in the Braşov District Championship, finishing 3rd in Group 2. The club achieved promotion to Divizia B next season by winning the District Championship final, but the competition was postponed because of the Second World War. During the war championships (unofficial status), UAB battled for promotion in Divizia A at the end of the 1942–1943, losing the playoffs to Uzinele Metalurgice Cugir. The 1943–1944 season was halted midway because of the Allied bombing missions over Romania. The city of Braşov was, alongside Bucharest and Ploieşti, one of the main targets, and Uzinele Astra Braşov were bombed on two occasions, 16 April and 6 June 1944, sustaining major damages.

The club finished 4th în Group 1 of the District Championship of the 1945–1946 season, the first official post war competition, and 3rd in Divizia C 1946–1947, in which the starting XI was formed by: Moraru - Orghidan, Szurd - Nichita, Zelenak, Grosaru - Nagy, Antonescu, Herold, Caceavski, Vlad.

Uzinele Astra Braşov's biggest rival during the 1940-1950 period were ACFR Braşov. In the 1941–1942 season, UAB lost top spot in the District Championship to ACFR by goal difference, were defeated 4–0 in the 1947 final for promotion in Divizia B, but won the 1950 District Championship Final with 3–0 on aggregate (3-0 home, 0–0 away).

The generation of Silviu Ploeșteanu

After the winning the final against ACFR in 1950, the club under command of former pre-war striker and Romanian international Silviu Ploeșteanu went on through a lengthy playoff series to promote into Divizia B. Steagul Roşu defeated Armata Câmpulung Muscel in round 1 (3-1/3-0), Spartac Curtea de Argeş (9-0/2-0), Spartac Banca RPR Bucharest (4-1/1-1/0-3/4-2/2-0) and Industria Sârmei Brăilă in the final (0-0/2-0).

In 1960 the team featured; Nicolae Proca, Gheorghe Fusulan, Gheorghe Ciripoi, Tică Constantinescu, Gheorghe Percea, Octavian Zaharia and Gheorghe Raicu; later supplemented by Stephen Hidișan (who continued as coach, a discoverer of talent), Nicolae Campo, Ioan Szigeti, Alexandru Meszaros, Vasile Seredai, Dorin Gane, Valer Târnăveanu and Dorin Necula.

The generation of the "Mexican trio"

The following generation is the one of the trio Nicolae Pescaru – Stere Adamache – Mihai Ivăncescu, the generation that provided three players to the Romania national team at the World Cup in 1970 at Mexico.

The death of Iuliu Năftănăilă on 28 August 1967 shocked the club. Not only had Brașov lost one of its greatest talents, but were obliged to play U Cluj just 48 hours after the funeral. Their following demotion resulted in the replacement of Silviu Ploeșteanu as the coach of the team, replaced by Valentin Stănescu.

This generation links to the names of Csaba Györffy, Iuliu Jenei, Călin Gane, Marcel Goran, Petre Cadar, Cazar Ardeleanu, Adrian Hârlab and Virgil Grecea – a generation consisting of some of the most long term team members.

The generation of the '80s
The generation of the 1980s brought the team back on the first stage, after five years of penance in the second division. Players include; Vasile Papuc, Vasile Gherghe, Marian Paraschivescu, Valer Șulea, Costel Spirea, Vasile Bențea, Gherasim Chioreanu, Adrian Furnică, Constantin Manciu, Nicolae Bucur, Nicolae Adami, Mihai Panache and Petre Marinescu, Marius Lăcătuș, Ion Batacliu, Nistor Văidean, Ion Mandoca and Dumitru Stângaciu.

The team were demoted into League "B" for a season.

A leap in the line of time and the World Cup of '94
After the events of December '89, the next generation sent Marian Ivan to the '94 World Cup in the USA. Players of the time include Tibor Selymes, Ionel Pârvu, Laszlo Polgar, Emil Spirea, Sandu Andrași, Iulian Chiriță, Dorel Purdea, and Marius Todericiu.

The new generation, an indigenous one
The junior teams of FC Brașov began to produce young talent; Alexandru Marc, Marius Constantin, Romeo Surdu, Ioan Coman, Silviu Pintea, Ionuț Vasiliu and Dragoș Luca – the generation formed by "Municipal" or "ICIM", the generation that brought the titles of champions or vice-champions back to Brașov.

In the first round of the 2001–02 UEFA Cup Steagul Roșu met the much more titrated Italian team Inter Milan, but they lost 0–6 on aggregate.

Ups and downs

In the 2004–05 season FC Brașov finished in 15th place and were relegated to Liga II. In the following season in Liga II they finished in 3rd place, (after Ceahlăul Piatra Neamț and local rival Forex Brașov a relatively new club at that time) and therefore missed promotion to Liga I.

In the next season FC Brașov finished in 10th place, closer to the relegation than the promotion. But 2007–08 season saw a return to Liga I for the team after they finished in 1st place, with 78 points.

After the promotion FC Brașov finished only in the middle and lower part of the table in their first 4 seasons. Then, in the 2012–13 season they finished on 7th place, the best performance in 10 years. After this good result, next season they finished in 15th place and again faced relegated to Liga II.  But the club was saved by FC Vaslui, which did not receive the license for the next season, being relegated .

2014–15 season was one of restructuring for Liga I which it would have 14 teams instead of 18, at the end of the season relegated the last 6 places instead of 4 with FC Brașov being among them.

Insolvency and bankruptcy
In the spring of 2015 FC Brașov had financial problems and went into insolvency.  In the summer of 2015 all the team's players changed and the target was promotion to Liga I. But by the end of the season they were in 5th place, outside the promotion places.

In the summer of 2016 the team did not have the budget needed to participate in Liga II and financial problems continued to multiply. The situation was saved with a few weeks before the start of the new season when Alexandru Chipciu, a former player of the team, was sold by Steaua București to Anderlecht and FC Brașov received a stake in the transfer. Cornel Țălnar was named the new manager and the goal was still promotion, considered the only financial recovery solution of the club. The team started well, but finished the season in 7th place.

After the end of the championship, FC Brașov announced that the team will not join the new season of Liga II, and was declared bankrupt.

Successors
In the summer of 2017 The Flag-bearers Supporters League announced the establishment of AS SR (meaning: Asociația Sportivă Steagul Roșu - The Red Flag Sporting Association) Brașov, club set up by the model followed by FC Vaslui, Petrolul Ploiești, Oțelul Galați or Farul Constanța, big clubs in Romanian football which were also dissolved and brought back to life by their supporters.

In the summer of 2021, Corona Brașov merged with ACS Scotch Club (FC Brașov brand bearer) and established FC Brașov (2021). The supporters refused to support the new project.

The Romanian Football Federation announced before the start of the 2021–22 Liga II championship, that Brașov city hall, the owner of the logo, history and all of FC Brașov's football records, approves the use of these by FC Brașov (2021). So from a legal point of view, from now on, this team will be considered as the official and legal successor of the old FC Brașov (1936) team.

Colors
At start the club had white and blue as the club's official colors. These remained the colors of the team until December 1966. The change came following a tournament of Romania's Olympic football team in Uruguay.

After a match with Peñarol, Csaba Györffy, player at FC Brasov, received from Peñarol's captain Alberto Spencer the shirt with which he played. Györffy was fascinated by the combination of yellow and black stripes and decided at the return in the country to wear the shirt during his training sessions with the team.

The decision to change the colors of the club was taken by coach Silviu Ploeşteanu, who considered that, in the new colors, the team will be seen better on the field. Since January 1967, the team from Brașov has yellow-black as official colors, recalling the Uruguayan Peñarol team.

Stadium

The club played its home matches on Stadionul Silviu Ploeșteanu from Brașov, a stadium with a capacity of 8,800 seats, the biggest of Brașov County. In the past the club also played matches considered to be at home on Stadionul Municipal, which was demolished in 2008.

Support
FC Brașov had many supporters in Brașov County. The ultras groups of SR Brașov are organized in The Flag-bearers Supporters League and they have friendly relations with Gaz Metan Mediaş and Ceahlăul Piatra Neamţ's fans.

Honours

Domestic
Liga I
Runners-up (1): 1959–60
Liga II
Winners (6): 1956, 1968–69, 1979–80, 1983–84, 1998–99, 2007–08
Runners-up (2): 1976–77, 1978–79

European
Balkans Cup
Winners (1): 1960–61

European record

1The competition was played in a group of 5 teams. FC Brașov finished first and won the cup.
2The game was replayed in a third leg match in Brașov, that Espanyol won 1–0.

References

Defunct football clubs in Romania
Football clubs in Brașov
Football clubs in Brașov County
Sport in Brașov
Association football clubs established in 1936
Association football clubs disestablished in 2017
Liga I clubs
Liga II clubs
1936 establishments in Romania
2017 disestablishments in Romania